Common Program may refer to:

 The Common Program (1949) - interim Chinese constitution
 Programme commun - French left wing policy program